Group 2 of the 2007 FIFA Women's World Cup was one of four groups of nations competing at the 2007 FIFA Women's World Cup. The group's first round of matches began on September 11 and its last matches were played on September 18. Most matches were played at the Chengdu Sports Center in Chengdu. All 4 teams in this group were drawn to Group A in previous edition, the first time in FIFA tournaments history.

United States topped the group, joined in the second round by North Korea, the only team the United States failed to beat. Sweden surprisingly failed to make the second round.

Standings

Matches
All times are local (UTC+8)

United States vs North Korea

Nigeria vs Sweden

Sweden vs United States

North Korea vs Nigeria

Nigeria vs United States

North Korea vs Sweden

References

Group
Group
Group
2007 in North Korean football
2007–08 in Nigerian football